Oxystele sinensis, common name the pink-lipped topshell, is a species of sea snail, a marine gastropod mollusk in the family Trochidae, the top snails.

Description
The size of the shell varies between 18 mm and 51 mm.

Distribution
This marine species occurs off False Bay to South Transkei, South Africa.

Ecology
Especially small individuals of this species that live in the intertidal zone are predated upon by rock lobsters. Larger individuals largely escape this predator by migrating to deeper waters, where they find a size refuge.

References

 Contributions to the knowledge of South African marine Mollusca; Annals of The South African Museum vol. 47; 1963
 Donald K.M., Kennedy M. & Spencer H.G. (2005) The phylogeny and taxonomy of austral monodontine topshells (Mollusca: Gastropoda: Trochidae), inferred from DNA sequences. Molecular Phylogenetics and Evolution 37: 474–483

External links
 

Endemic fauna of South Africa
sinensis
Gastropods described in 1791